This was the first edition of the tournament.

Nina Stojanović won the title, defeating Xu Shilin in the final, 6–0, 6–4.

Seeds

Draw

Finals

Top half

Bottom half

References
Main Draw

ITF Women's Circuit – Baotou - Singles
2018 in Chinese tennis